Alexander Main (1900–1973) was an Australian rugby league footballer who played in the 1920s.

Playing career
Former Newtown, Glebe and St. George fullback relocated to the Tamworth, New South Wales as a player/coach in 1925 where he remained into the 1930s. Main played representative football for Northern Division in 1925 and North West N.S.W. in 1930 against touring rep teams.

Death
Main died on 16 August 1973 at Caringbah, New South Wales.

References

1900 births
1973 deaths
Australian rugby league players
St. George Dragons players
Glebe rugby league players
Newtown Jets players
Rugby league players from Sydney
Rugby league fullbacks